United Nations Security Council Resolution 1678, adopted unanimously on May 15, 2006, after reaffirming all resolutions on the situation between Eritrea and Ethiopia, particularly resolutions 1640 (2005), 1661 (2006) and 1670 (2006), the Council extended the mandate of the United Nations Mission in Ethiopia and Eritrea (UNMEE) until the end of May 2006.

Resolution

Observations
The Security Council reaffirmed its support for the peace process between the two countries and the full implementation of the Algiers Agreement. It welcomed progress made at a meeting of the Eritrea-Ethiopia Boundary Commission (EEBC) in March 2006.

Acts
Resolution 1678 renewed the mandate of UNMEE until May 31, 2006, and again demanded that Ethiopia and Eritrea comply with Resolution 1640. All states were called upon to provide contributions to the trust fund and support UNMEE.

Furthermore, Council members decided that, in the event of non-compliance with Resolution 1640, and in light of the outcome of the EEBC meeting on May 17, 2006, adjustments would be made to the mandate and troop level of UNMEE by the end of May 2006.

Finally, the Secretary-General Kofi Annan was instructed to report on compliance with Resolution 1640 within seven days and to also provide suggestions on adjusting UNMEE's mandate to support the demarcation process.

See also
 Badme
 Eritrean–Ethiopian War
 List of United Nations Security Council Resolutions 1601 to 1700 (2005–2006)

References

External links
 
Text of the Resolution at undocs.org

 1678
2006 in Eritrea
2006 in Ethiopia
 1678
 1678
Eritrea–Ethiopia border
May 2006 events